The Wihuri International Prize is a prize awarded by the Wihuri Foundation for International Prizes to people who have furthered the cultural or economic development in Finland. Founded in 1953 by Antti Wihuri, The Wihuri Foundation for International Prizes also awards the music prize Wihuri Sibelius Prize. The awarded prizes range from EUR 30,000 to 150,000, and a prize must be awarded at least every three years.

The prize may be awarded to private individuals or organizations regardless of nationality, religion, race or language. The International Prize has been awarded to mostly Finnish and foreign scientists. The first Wihuri International Prize was awarded on October 9, 1958, the birthday of Antti Wihuri, to Mathematics Professor Rolf Nevanlinna. By 2015 the Wihuri Foundation for International Prizes has awarded 19 Wihuri International Prizes.

Prizewinners

References

Finnish awards